Shchors is a 1939 Soviet biopic film directed by Oleksandr Dovzhenko and Yuliya Solntseva. Commissioned by Joseph Stalin, the film is a biography of the partisan leader and Ukrainian Bolshevik Nikolai Shchors. Shchors is played by Yevgeny Samoylov (1912–2006).

Synopsis
Cheered up by the revolutionary zeal, the courage and the energy of their leader Nikolai Alexandrovitch Shchors, in 1919 the peasants and workers groups gather in the devastated by the civil war in Ukraine, to defeat the foreign conquerors and enemies of the revolution. Shchors and his troops advance to Kiev, the seat of the bourgeois nationalists under their leader Symon Petliura, and take over the city. Other villages and towns fall. A bitter struggle with major losses blazes about Berdychiv. But Shchors' revolutionary forces remain victorious.

However, it does not take long until a new danger threatens: this time the Polish Pans enter Ukraine, and General Dragomirov marches to Kiev. Shchors, however, gathers the revolutionary forces of the country and brings them to a victorious counter-attack.

Cast 
 Yevgeny Samoylov as Nikolay Shchors (as E. Samoylov)
 Ivan Skuratov as Bozhenko
 Luka Lyashenko as Severin Chernyak / Grandpa Chizh (as L. Lyashenko)
 Yu. Titov as Burdenko - Commander
 P. Krasilich as Gavrichenko - Commander
 Aleksandr Grechany as Mikhaylyuk - Commander (as A. Grechanyy)
 Nikolai Makarenko as Antonyuk - Commander (as N. Makarenko)
 Yuriy Bantysh as Soldier (as Yu. Bantysh)
 Dmitry Barvinsky as Soldier (as D. Barvinskiy)
 Dmitry Kostenko as Soldier (as D. Kostenko)

References

External links
 
  (English subtitles)
 

1930s biographical drama films
Soviet biographical drama films
Russian biographical drama films
1939 films
Soviet black-and-white films
Films directed by Alexander Dovzhenko
Films directed by Yuliya Solntseva
Films set in Ukraine
Dovzhenko Film Studios films
Russian Civil War films
1930s Russian-language films
Soviet-era Ukrainian films
Russian-language Ukrainian films
Ukrainian biographical films
1939 drama films
Russian black-and-white films
Ukrainian drama films